Kim Min-woo (Hangul: 김민우, Hanja: 金敏雨) (born March 21, 1979 in Seoul, South Korea) is a retired South Korean infielder. He batted and threw right-handed.

Amateur career
Upon graduation from high school, Kim, one of the top right-handed pitching prospects, was drafted by the Hyundai Unicorns in the second round of the  KBO Draft, but he subsequently opted instead to enter Hanyang University and play college baseball.

In his freshman year, Kim converted from a pitcher to a position player, and next year he was selected for the South Korea national baseball team as an infielder and competed in the 1999 Intercontinental Cup.

Notable international careers

Professional career

Hyundai Unicorns
Prior to the 2002 KBO season, he tried to convert to a switch hitter. However, it ended up with a blunder, only batting .195 and striking out 20 times in 41 at-bats. In , Kim spend most of his sophomore season in the reserve league, but was added to the Unicorns' first team after the September roster expansion and batted a respectable .368 (7-for-19). He was named to the Korean Series final roster and received a 2003 Korean Series champion ring.

In , Kim fell into a horrendous slump again, batting only .125 and whiffing 14 times in only 48 at-bats. After the season, he decided to serve military service and played baseball in the Police Baseball Team as a military duty.

Nexen Heroes 
Kim came back to the KBO League in  when he finished the military service, but was on the Heroes' roster off and on for the 2008 season, batting a career-low .056 (1-for-18), playing in only 16 games as a substitute infielder or pinch hitter.

Kim batted a respectable .264 (33-for-125) with 3 home runs and 10 RBI in the  season, appearing in 78 games as a backup infielder.

Kim hit the first home run of the  KBO baseball season off Lotte Giants starter Ryan Sadowski, going 2-for-4 in the Heroes' opening game on March 27. He went 3-for-6 in the following game on March 28 before taking over as the 2010 Heroes' regular second baseman. In July, Kim moved his position to third base and became a permanent fixture as Heroes' franchise third baseman Hwang Jae-Gyun was traded to the Lotte Giants. Kim finished his first season as a full-time player with a .257 batting average, 9 home runs and 44 RBI, appearing in 128 games. He was ranked ninth in the KBO league in triples (3), tenth in stolen bases (28), eleventh in walks (70) and twelfth in at-bats (447), posting career-highs in most of the offensive categories.

External links 
 Profile and stats on the KBO official site 

1979 births
Living people
Baseball players from Seoul
South Korean baseball players
Hyundai Unicorns players
Kiwoom Heroes players
Kia Tigers players
KBO League infielders